Monica Joan Tranel (also Tranel-Michini; born May 4, 1966) is an American rower, lawyer, and former political candidate. She competed at the 1996 and 2000 Summer Olympics. A member of the Democratic Party, Tranel ran unsuccessfully for Montana's 1st congressional district in the 2022 United States House of Representatives elections in Montana. Previously, she was twice a candidate for the Montana Public Service Commission and sought election to the Helena City Commission.

Early life and education
Tranel was born in Big Horn, Wyoming, on May 4, 1966. She grew up across Montana, including in Miles City, Ashland, and Billings. She graduated from Billings Central Catholic High School, where she competed in basketball and track.

In 1988, Tranel earned a Bachelor of Arts from Gonzaga University. In 1991, she earned her Juris Doctor from Rutgers University–Camden.

Rowing
In 1991, Tranel started rowing in competition. In 1993, Tranel won a bronze medal in women's coxed four at the World Rowing Championships.

In 1994, she was rowing in the Fairmount Rowing Association. She competed in the World Rowing Championships in Tampere, Finland, that year, where her team won gold. In 1995, Tranel won a silver media in women's coxed eights at the World Championships at the Royal Canadian Henley Rowing Course in Saint Catharines, Ontario.

She finished 4th in the women's eight at the 1996 Summer Olympics. She also competed in the 2000 Summer Olympics, where she finished 12th in women's singles scull races.

The University of Montana named one of their  four-seat competition boats "The Tranel" in her honor.

In 2015, Tranel placed 23rd in the Head of the Charles Regatta in Cambridge, Massachusetts.

Political and legal career

Local and state-level offices
In 2004, as a Republican, Tranel sought election to the Montana Public Service Commission while working as a staff attorney at the commission. She was defeated in the Republican primary.

After working at the commission for four years, Tranel worked for Republican Senator Conrad Burns in Washington, D.C., for a short time, before returning to Butte, Montana, in 2005 and opening a private practice in 2006. She later left the Republican Party.

From 2010 to 2013, Tranel served as a trustee for the Montana Bar Association. In 2015, Tranel ran for the Helena City Commission.

In 2020, as a Democrat, Tranel again sought election to the Montana Public Service Commission. She was defeated in the general election by Montana Senator Jennifer Fielder, a Republican.

U.S. House of Representatives
Tranel was the Democratic candidate for Montana's western congressional district, running against Ryan Zinke and John Lamb. During the lead-up to the 2022 United States House of Representatives elections in Montana, American vlogger Hank Green interviewed Tranel in Missoula and Bozeman. Tranel lost to Zinke in the general election, receiving 46% of the vote to Zinke's 50%.

Personal life
Tranel has nine siblings. She and her second husband, Jack Morris, had two daughters. Tranel described herself as "a single mother" in 2015.

Starting in 2001, she lived in Helena, Montana, for several years. She currently lives in Missoula with her husband, former state senator Greg Lind, and her three daughters.

References

External links 
 Monica Tranel for Congress campaign website

1966 births
Living people
American female rowers
People from Big Horn, Wyoming
Rowers at the 1996 Summer Olympics
Rowers at the 2000 Summer Olympics
Olympic rowers of the United States
World Rowing Championships medalists for the United States
Women in Montana politics
Montana Democrats
Montana Republicans
Rutgers Law School alumni
21st-century American women lawyers
21st-century American lawyers
American athlete-politicians
21st-century American women politicians
Gonzaga University alumni
Candidates in the 2022 United States House of Representatives elections
21st-century American politicians